Castle Hill, an electoral district of the Legislative Assembly in the Australian state of New South Wales has had one incarnation, from 2007 to the present.


Members for Castle Hill

Election results

Elections in the 2010s

2019

2015

2011

Elections in the 2000s

2007

References

New South Wales state electoral results by district